Hilde Lindset (born 6 May 1978 in Oslo) is a Norwegian author.

She grew up in Solum in Skien, and holds a cand.philol. degree in literature. She has published two collections of short stories. In 2013, she was the first recipient of the Saabye Christensen Award.

She has been a lecturer in Norwegian language and literature at the Goethe University in Frankfurt, and currently lives in Berlin.

Works 
 Jeg burde ha sperret deg inne, Cappelen Damm, 2012
 Helvetesporten, Cappelen Damm, 2014
 Til døden, Cappelen Damm, 2016
 Avskjeder med Judith, Cappelen Damm, 2017

References 

1978 births
Living people
People from Skien
Norwegian women short story writers
Norwegian expatriates in Germany